John Albert Knebel (born October 4, 1936) is a former United States government official who served as Secretary of Agriculture under President Gerald Ford.

Biography

Early life and education 
Knebel was born in Tulsa, Oklahoma on October 4, 1936. He graduated from West Point in 1959 and received his Master's at Creighton University in 1962. In 1965, he received his law degree from American University. Between 1965 and 1968 he was engaged in private practice with the firm of Howrey, Simon, Baker and Murchison in Washington, DC. He was a legislative assistant to Congressman J. Ernest Wharton in 1963 and 1964 and served as general counsel to the Small Business Administration during Nixon's second term. He was also a member of the American, Federal, and District of Columbia Bar Association. In March 1971, he became the General Counsel of the Small Business Administration, and in January 1973 he was appointed as General Counsel of the Department of Agriculture. He was a partner in the law firm of Brownstein, Zeidman, Schomer and Chase from April until December 1975, when he was named the Under Secretary/Deputy Secretary of Agriculture.

U.S. Secretary of Agriculture 
On November 4, 1976, Knebel was named Secretary of Agriculture to by President Gerald R. Ford after his predecessor, Earl L. Butz resigned amid a scandal involving a racist comment. His period in this office was brief and ended January 20, 1977, when Jimmy Carter replaced Ford in the White House.

Personal life
Knebel married Zenia Marks of New Jersey, with whom he has had three children. He and his family resided in McLean, Virginia at the time on his appointment as Secretary of Agriculture in 1976.

References

External links
Profiles of former Secretaries of Agriculture
American President site

|-

1936 births
Living people
United States Secretaries of Agriculture
Washington College of Law alumni
Creighton University alumni
United States Military Academy alumni
Politicians from Tulsa, Oklahoma
American people of German descent
Ford administration cabinet members
20th-century American politicians
Oklahoma Republicans